Raymond City is an unincorporated community in Putnam County, West Virginia, United States.

The town is located at the mouth of the Pocatalico River at the Kanawha River on West Virginia Route 62. The community is to the immediate north of the town of Poca.

References

Unincorporated communities in Putnam County, West Virginia
Unincorporated communities in West Virginia
Charleston, West Virginia metropolitan area
Populated places on the Kanawha River